U.S. Route 77 (US 77) is a major highway that is part of the United States Numbered Highway System that runs from the Veterans International Bridge in Brownsville to Sioux City, Iowa. The highway is being upgraded to a freeway near Corpus Christi to connect to the freeway part of the highway in Raymondville as part of future I-69. A freeway in Robstown is already signed as part of I-69. From Waco to the Oklahoma state line, US 77 overlaps or runs parallel to I-35/I-35E.

Route description

US 77 crosses the Rio Grande with US 83 on the Veterans International Bridge. The two highways run together concurrent with I-69E until Harlingen. US 83 runs west (north) along I-2 to McAllen while US 77 runs north along with I-69E to Raymondville where the I-69E designated temporarily ends. North of Raymondville, the highway passes through Kenedy County, serving the county seat of Sarita; US 77 is the only highway to run through the county.

In Robstown, US 77 again picks up the I-69E designation until the interchange with I-37 in north Corpus Christi. US 77 shares a short overlap with I-37 before leaving the highway. US 77 runs through many small to mid-size communities before arriving in Waco. Here, US 77 begins its overlap with I-35 that lasts until Hillsboro, where the highway then parallels I-35E until Red Oak. North of Red Oak, US 77 overlaps I-35E through Dallas, leaving the interstate again in Denton. In Denton, US 77 is a suburban road that serves the downtown area and has an overlap with US 377 in the town, intersecting US 380 near Texas Women's University. After an interchange with Loop 288, US 77 rejoins I-35 in north Denton. US 77 remains concurrent with I-35 through Gainesville then crosses the Red River into Oklahoma.

History
US 77 was designated in 1927 from Gainesville to Corpus Christi. In 1943, the highway was extended south of Corpus Christi to the international border at Brownsville; this extension also rerouted the section of highway between Sinton and Corpus Christi, as the previous route traveled through Gregory between the two towns. In 1953, US 77 was rerouted between Halletsville and Victoria over former SH 295. The section of highway through Victoria was rerouted in 1978 to remove a concurrency with US 59, but this cancelled the following year. In 1997, US 77 was extended so the highway's official designation ran to the Los Tomates International Bridge in Brownsville. In 2000, the city of Denton turned US 77 into a pair of one-ways streets from US 377 to FM 2164, with northbound traffic using Locust Street and southbound traffic using Elm Street. In 2003, the section of US 77 in Robstown between FM 892 and 9th Street was removed the state highway system as construction of a bypass around the town began.

In August 2011, TxDOT received permission from the Federal Highway Administration (FHWA) to designate the Robstown bypass as I-69 due to it already being built to Interstate Highway standards and connecting to another Interstate Highway; the American Association of State Highway and Transportation Officials (AASHTO) approved the designation later that year in October. An official ceremony was held on December 5, 2011 to unveil I-69 signs on the Robstown-Corpus Christi freeway. This section of the highway was later re-designated as I-69E in 2013, though most of the original I-69 signage is still in place.

The section of freeway in the East Rio Grande Valley received approval for Interstate designation in May 2013. This section of highway was designated as I-69E as the two other branches of I-69, I-69C and I-69W were also approved. Signage was installed over the summer of 2013.

Future
US 77 from Raymondville to Victoria is planned to be upgraded to I-69E. South of Corpus Christi, US 77 is a freeway around most of Kingsville, with interchanges being constructed at US 77 Bus. and FM 1717 south of the town that would complete the freeway in Kingsville. A short freeway section of US 77 also exists in the town of Bishop, though the Kingsville and Bishop freeways are currently not connected. A bypass of Driscoll is being constructed, with the northbound lanes open to traffic while the southbound lanes are expected to open in 2022.

Between Corpus Christi and Victoria, US 77 is still mostly a divided highway that does not bypass most of the towns it travels through. As of June 2022, Sinton is the only town along this section of US 77 that the highway bypasses. Once completed, I-69E will end at I-69W (US 59) in Victoria, with those two Interstates forming I-69.

Major intersections

Notes

References

77
Transportation in Cameron County, Texas
Transportation in Willacy County, Texas
Transportation in Kenedy County, Texas
Transportation in Kleberg County, Texas
Transportation in Nueces County, Texas
Transportation in San Patricio County, Texas
Transportation in Refugio County, Texas
Transportation in Victoria County, Texas
Transportation in DeWitt County, Texas
Transportation in Lavaca County, Texas
Transportation in Fayette County, Texas
Transportation in Lee County, Texas
Transportation in Milam County, Texas
Transportation in Falls County, Texas
Transportation in McLennan County, Texas
Transportation in Hill County, Texas
Transportation in Ellis County, Texas
Transportation in Dallas County, Texas
Transportation in Denton County, Texas
Transportation in Cooke County, Texas
 Texas